Taiyi Shengshui is an ancient Chinese text written around 300 BC during the Warring States period.  It is part of the Guodian Chu Slips.

It is a Taoist creation myth. According to the transcription and translation by professors Wen Xing and Robert G. Henricks of Dartmouth College, the opening lines are:
The Great One gave birth to water.
Water returned and assisted Taiyi,
in this way developing heaven. Heaven returned and assisted Taiyi, in this way developing the earth.
Heaven and earth [repeatedly assisted each other],
in this way developing the "gods above and below."
The "gods above and below" repeatedly assisted each other,
in this way developing Yin and Yang.

Commentators describe Taiyi as a representation of Heaven (James Legge), an impersonal "Watery Chaos" (Kong Yingda). At least one scholar (Medhurst) interprets this as the "Supreme One", possibly Shangdi.

The Taiyi Shengshui was written on 14 bamboo strips and was discovered in 1993 in Hubei, Jingmen (the Guodian Chu Slips).

References 

Taoist texts
Zhou dynasty texts
4th-century BC works